Jeti-Ögüz is a balneotherapic resort located at the Jeti-Ögüz Rocks near Issyk Kul in the Jeti-Ögüz District of Issyk-Kul Region of Kyrgyzstan, about 28 km west of Karakol, and near Jeti-Ögüz village. Its population was 337 in 2021.

History
The thermal springs of Jeti-Ögüz were known to local inhabitants since antiquity.  The place became known to Europe after 1856 when Semenov-Tian-Shanskii first visited it.  Since 1965 the resort operates year-round.  In 1991, an important meeting between Boris Yeltsin and Askar Akayev took place in Jeti-Ögüz.

Places of interest
This resort is a common destination of interest for citizens of Kyrgyzstan, as well as a popular destination for tourists to Kyrgyzstan. The Jeti-Ögüz Rocks are located in vicinity of the resort. From the resort, with a hike or ride on horse-back of several hours, one may reach a waterfall located in a gully, as well as a pine-tree plantation. This is a popular trek for tourists and visitors.

References

Resorts in Kyrgyzstan
Spas
Issyk-Kul Region